Michael W. Holmes (PhD, Princeton Theological Seminary) is the former Chair of the Department of Biblical and Theological Studies at Bethel University in St. Paul, Minnesota and has taught at Bethel since 1982.

Life 
Holmes received his B.A. (in history) from the University of California at Santa Barbara (1973), an M.A. in New Testament from TEDS (1976), and his Ph.D. from Princeton Seminary (1984).  He did his PhD work under Bruce Metzger, who was widely considered to be one of the most influential New Testament scholars of the 20th century. Holmes' primary research areas are in New Testament textual criticism and the Apostolic Fathers.

He was previously on the faculty at Trinity Evangelical Divinity School and Princeton Theological Seminary, and has been visiting scholar at Luther Theological Seminary in St. Paul. 

His publications include several books, around fifty articles, essays, and chapters in book. He has also done more than 220 book reviews (covering more than 240 books in 23 journals). Holmes has presented papers and invited lectures in the U.S., Canada, England, Germany, France, and Belgium. He speaks and teaches frequently at Twin Cities churches, universities, and seminaries, has served as an interim pastor, and is a long-term member of Trinity Baptist Church (Maplewood, MN).

Holmes is a member of the International Greek New Testament Project, a member of the Editorial Board for New Testament Studies, a book review editor for Religious Studies Review, and chair of the Board of Directors of the Center for the Study of New Testament Manuscripts. He holds membership in the Studiorum Novi Testamenti Societas, the Society of Biblical Literature, the Institute for Biblical Research, and the North American Patristics Society.

Publications

References

Year of birth missing (living people)
Living people
American biblical scholars
New Testament scholars
Bethel University (Minnesota) faculty
Princeton Theological Seminary alumni
Trinity Evangelical Divinity School alumni
University of California, Santa Barbara alumni